R359 road may refer to:
 R359 road (Ireland)
 R359 road (South Africa)